Arsen Ruslanovich Adamov (born 20 October 1999) is a Russian professional footballer who plays as a left-back or right-back for FC Zenit Saint Petersburg. He is of Chechen descent.

Club career
He was first included in the senior team of FC Akhmat Grozny in July 2017 for a game against FC Dynamo Moscow and remained on the bench in that game.

He made his debut in the Russian Premier League for FC Akhmat Grozny three years later, on 22 July 2020 in a game against FC Krasnodar, as a starter.

On 15 January 2021, he signed with FC Ural Yekaterinburg.

On 25 January 2022, FC Zenit St.Petersburg announced the signing of Adamov from Ural Yekaterinburg on a contract until the end of 2025–26 season.

International career
He was called up to the Russia national football team for the first time for World Cup qualifiers against Slovakia and Slovenia in October 2021.

Personal life
Adamov is a grandson of Chechen football coach and politician Khaydar Alkhanov.

Honours

Club
Zenit Saint Petersburg
Russian Premier League: 2021–22

Career statistics

References

External links
 
 
 

1999 births
People from Nizhny Tagil
Living people
Russian footballers
Russia youth international footballers
Association football defenders
FC Akhmat Grozny players
FC Ural Yekaterinburg players
FC Zenit Saint Petersburg players
Russian Premier League players
Sportspeople from Sverdlovsk Oblast